Caperonotus superbum is a species of beetle in the family Cerambycidae. It was described by Per Olof Christopher Aurivillius in 1897.

References

Compsocerini
Beetles described in 1897